The National Defence Party was an Icelandic political movement which operated from 1902 to 1912, founded because of discontentedness with a clause in the Icelandic constitution that stated that the Icelandic minister should bring up cases in the Danish Council of State. The clause was in the constitution from 1903 to 1915, at which point the Danish king ordered that it should be removed.

The founders of Landvarnarflokkurinn, who included Einar Benediktsson, Bjarni Jónsson and Jón Jensson, were the most radical fighters for Iceland's independence of that time.

References
 Íslenska Alfræðiorðabókin H-O. 1990. Editors: Dóra Hafsteinsdóttir and Sigríður Harðardóttir. Örn og Örlygur hf., Reykjavík.
 Íslenska Alfræðiorðabókin P-Ö. 1990. Editors: Dóra Hafsteinsdóttir and Sigríður Harðardóttir. Örn og Örlygur hf., Reykjavík.

Defunct political parties in Iceland
Political parties established in 1902
1902 establishments in Iceland
Political parties disestablished in 1912
1912 disestablishments in Iceland